"Lines" is a song written by the American singer-songwriter Jerry Fuller, first recorded by the American pop group The Walker Brothers as their twelfth UK single in 1976. Fuller later recorded and released his own version to some minor success in the US (#90) and Canadian Country charts in 1979.

The Walker Brothers' recording of "Lines" failed to chart, their first to miss the UK Singles Chart since their debut "Pretty Girls Everywhere" in 1965. The B-side "First Day" was written by John Walker under the pseudonym A. Dayam.

Track listing

References

1976 singles
The Walker Brothers songs
Songs written by Jerry Fuller
GTO Records singles
1976 songs